Nibea semifasciata, commonly known as the sharpnose croaker, is a species of fish native to the western Pacific Ocean.

References

Fish of Thailand
Fish of China
Fish described in 1963
Fish of the Pacific Ocean
Sciaenidae